Shaheen (English: Falcon) is an Indian television series which aired on Sony Entertainment Television in 2000. It was produced by Arvishi Cine Vision's production house and stars Juhi Parmar in the lead role.

Plot

Shaheen is a young Muslim girl who lives in Mumbai and dreams of doing  something in life. Her father's only dream is to get her married into a rich royal family of Nawabs. Shaheen's dreams are shattered when she gets to know that her father has fixed her marriage with a Lucknow-based widower Nawab Junaid. There is a significant age difference between Shaheen and Junaid but she surrenders to her father's wishes and marries Junaid.

Shaheen shifts to Lucknow with Junaid and gradually starts adjusting to a very different city and culture. However, she is soon shocked to discover that Junaid has a son from his previous marriage, a fact her father hid from her. Junaid then tells her that he can never give her the place of his first wife. Shaheen decides to carry on and joins a college with Junaid's support. There she meets a young poet named Rafee and falls in love with him.

The story then revolves around Shaheen's relationship with Junaid and how she must decide to choose between him and Rafee.

Cast

 Juhi Parmar as Shaheen
 Bhaveen Gossain as Nawab Junaid
Sushma Seth as Begum Sahiba
 Amit Behl 
 Tara Mehta
 Naved Aslam 
 Abha Dhulia
 Vandana Sajnani
 Manasi Upadhyay
 Ravikiran Shastry
 Neena Cheema
 Abhay Puniani
 Rutuja Shah
 Mahesh Kanwal
 Lopa Bhatt
 Manav Kaushik

References

External links

Indian television soap operas
Sony Entertainment Television original programming
2002 Indian television series debuts